Eustacesia is a genus of South American orb-weaver spiders containing the single species, Eustacesia albonotata. It was first described by Lodovico di Caporiacco in 1954, and has only been found in French Guiana.

References

Araneidae
Monotypic Araneomorphae genera
Spiders of South America